Maroochydore is an electoral district of the Legislative Assembly in the Australian state of Queensland.

It covers parts of the Sunshine Coast and takes in coastal areas between Coolum Beach and Mooloolaba, including Maroochydore.

The seat is currently held by Fiona Simpson of the Liberal National Party, who has held it since its creation ahead of the 1992 state election. Simpson was the Deputy Leader of the National Party from 2006 to 2008.

Members for Maroochydore

Election results

References

External links
 

Sunshine Coast, Queensland
Maroochydore
Maroochydore